The 2008 Sicilian regional election for the renewal of the Sicilian Regional Assembly and the election of the Presidency of Sicily, Italy, was held on 13 and on 14 April 2008.

The election was competed by two main competitors: Raffaele Lombardo for the centre-right and Anna Finocchiaro for the centre-left. Lombardo won by a landslide, 65.3% against 30.4% of Finocchiaro.

Results

Elections in Sicily
2008 elections in Italy
April 2008 events in Europe